Paul de Smeth (7 November 1859 – 10 December 1940) was a Belgian philatelist who signed the Roll of Distinguished Philatelists in 1926.

References

Signatories to the Roll of Distinguished Philatelists
1859 births
1940 deaths
Belgian philatelists